This article lists power stations in Afghanistan.

Hydroelectric

Gas

Oil

Solar

Wind

See also 
Energy in Afghanistan
List of dams and reservoirs in Afghanistan
List of power stations in Asia
List of largest power stations in the world

References

External links
Fifty-two investors interested in Afghanistan's 2,000 MW solar energy plan (April 16, 2019).
Afghanistan launches EoIs ahead of 2-GW solar tender (Dec. 18, 2018).
The Power of Nature: How Renewable Energy is Changing Lives in Afghanistan (UNDP, Sept. 13, 2017).

Afghanistan
Power stations in Afghanistan
Power stations